Alexandre Bergès (born 17 August 1868, date of death unknown) was a French fencer. He competed in the men's masters foil event at the 1900 Summer Olympics.

References

External links
 

1868 births
Year of death missing
French male foil fencers
Olympic fencers of France
Fencers at the 1900 Summer Olympics
Sportspeople from Lorient
Place of death missing